MGM Dizzee World is a theme park located in Chennai, Tamil Nadu, India. It is located in East Coast Road. The park has about 47 dry rides including- a log flume, Ferris wheel, spider spin, roller coaster, the funny mountain, dashing cars, super trooper,  a water world with 2 water parks for kids and adults to beat the heat and it also hosts special seasonal shows. It is one of biggest entertainment parks guaranteeing six hours of unlimited fun along with ample car parking facilities and exhilarating rides following safety measures. High demand and popular rides have specific timings though tickets starting at a minimal rate (about 700rs). They also have spectacular food court to devour your taste buds.

It is owned by MGM Group of Companies.

The park also hosts special features such as snow valley experience introduced during the early 2000s; an artificial snow shower with snow-capped mountain and a snow man. A perfect get away view to enjoy with your friends and family.

See also  
Tourism in Chennai
East Coast Road

References

External links 
List of rides in MGM Dizzee World
Official website of MGM Dizzee World

Amusement parks in Chennai
1995 establishments in Tamil Nadu
Amusement parks opened in 1995